Carmoly is a surname. Notable people with the surname include:

 Eliakim Carmoly (1802–1875), French rabbi, grandson of Isaachar
 Isaachar Bär ben Judah Carmoly (1735–1781), French rabbi